Jacob Johann Graf von Sievers (30 August 1731 – 23 July 1808) was a Baltic German statesman of the Russian Empire from the Sievers family.

Biography
After serving the Russian army during the Seven Years' War as quartermaster general, he was appointed governor of Novgorod in 1764 by Catherine II. He introduced the cultivation of potatoes to Russia, regulated the postal services, and was instrumental in the abolition of torture in 1767.

Based on Sievers' initiative, the provincial government reform was instituted; he was himself appointed general governor of Novgorod, Tver and Pskov. He was Russian ambassador to Poland and led the second and third partition of the kingdom. Emperor Paul I of Russia appointed him senator in 1796; in 1797 he became head of the new department for water communications. He was knighted in 1798.

In Sievers' honor, Alexander I named the channel that connects the outlet of the Msta River with the Volkhov river the Sievers Canal.

Notes and references

Sources
 Blum, Karl Ludwig: Ein russischer Staatsmann, Denkwürdigkeiten des Grafen von Sievers, Leipzig 1857–58, 4 vols.
 Blum, Karl Ludwig: Graf Jacob Johann von Sievers und Russland zu dessen Zeit. Leipzig; Heidelberg: Winter, 1864
 Jones, Robert E: Provincial Development in Russia. Catherine II and Jacob Sievers. Rutgers University Press, 1984

External links

 

1731 births
1808 deaths
People from Rakvere
People from the Governorate of Estonia
Baltic-German people
Russian nobility
Politicians of the Russian Empire
Ambassadors of the Russian Empire to Poland
Recipients of the Order of the White Eagle (Poland)